Phoebe Desmond (born 23 October 1990) is an Australian professional rugby league footballer. She previously played for the Newcastle Knights in the NRL Women's Premiership.

Background
Born in Singleton, New South Wales, Desmond played her junior rugby league for the Singleton Greyhounds.

Playing career

Early years
Desmond played five seasons for the Maitland Pickers, Hunter Stars and North Newcastle in the Sydney Metropolitan Women's Rugby League competition. She also played for the Aberglasslyn Ants. In early 2017, she represented the Singleton Greyhounds rugby league nines team, winning the Group 21 Rugby League nines title, before playing for the Newcastle Knights in an exhibition nines match against the Cronulla-Sutherland Sharks. Later that year, playing for North Newcastle, she was selected to represent the New South Wales Country women's side against New South Wales City. Desmond also spent some time in coaching, after she was kept on the sidelines for extended periods due to injuries. In 2021, she represented the Newcastle Maitland Region Knights side, winning the NSWRL Women's Country Championships final. In November 2021, she signed with the Newcastle Knights to be a part of their inaugural NRLW squad.

2022
In round 1 of the delayed 2021 NRL Women's season, Desmond made her NRLW debut for the Knights against the Parramatta Eels, scoring a try in the Knights' 12-13 loss. She played in 4 matches for the Knights, scoring one try, before parting ways with the club at the end of the season.

References

External links
Newcastle Knights profile

1990 births
Australian female rugby league players
Newcastle Knights (NRLW) players
Rugby league props
Living people